Teddy Soeriaatmadja (born 7 February 1975) is an Indonesian film director. Born in Japan and educated in Britain, Soeriaatmadja made his film debut in 2000 with the short film Culik (Kidnap); it was followed five years later by Banyu Biru (Blue Banyu), his feature film debut. Since then Soeriaatmadja has directed several films, including two which have garnered him a nomination for Best Director at the Indonesian Film Festival.

Early life
Soeriaatmadja was born in Japan on 7 February 1975 to Rhousdy Soeriaatmadja (father) and Siti Syarifah. As a child he enjoyed watching movies at home, such as the Star Wars and James Bond franchises; in an interview with the Jakarta-based periodical Tabloid Nova, he recalled watching three to four films a day. By 1991 he had written his first screenplay, entitled Desember (December), and after viewing Quentin Tarantino's film Reservoir Dogs in 1992, decided that he wanted to work in film. He wrote several further screenplays while studying at Newport University in South Wales (now the University of South Wales), two of which he later adapted for film.

In 1996, after finishing his master's degree in Britain, Soeriaatmadja returned to Indonesia, where he worked for a year at a soft drink company. With his savings, he began work on his first short film, entitled Culik (Kidnap), which followed an Indonesian employee who kidnapped his Australian boss after being fired; he received additional funding from the Gothenburg Film Festival in Sweden. The film debuted at the 2000 Jakarta International Film Festival. It was through the making of Culik that Soeriaatmadja met directors Mira Lesmana and Riri Riza, who facilitated his entry into the industry. To gain more experience, he began work on music videos and TV advertisements.

Feature film career
Soeriatmadja released his feature film debut, Banyu Biru (Blue Banyu), in 2005. The film, which followed a sales clerk on a road trip of self-discovery, had a budget of Rp. 5 billion. For Banyu Biru, Soeriaatmadja deliberately obscured the setting. A year end review of Indonesian films in The Jakarta Post described the film as "possibly the bravest and most original release of [March], if not the year." The following year he released Ruang (Room), a love story starring Winky Wiryawan, Luna Maya, and Slamet Rahardjo, which was moderately successful and garnered nine nominations at the 2006 Indonesian Film Festival, including Best Director.

Soeriaatmadja released Badai Pasti Berlalu, a remake of Teguh Karya's 1977 film of the same name, in 2007. The film, which starred Vino G. Bastian, Winky Wiryawan, and Raihaanun, followed a woman's struggle after being abandoned by her fiancé. For the film, Soeriaatmadja attempted to change several aspects of the original film and source work to better suit it for the 2000s, such as the main character's diabetes, but was refused by the original author, Marga T. Shortly after the film's release he married its star, Raihaanun.  the couple have a son, Millan Haruna Soeriaatmadja, with another due in June.

In 2009 Soeriaatmadja directed Ruma Maida (Maida's House), with a screenplay by Ayu Utami. The film, which detailed a woman's struggle to save a historic house from a developer while showing the life of the house's original owner, garnered a Best Director nomination for Soeriaatmadja at the 2009 Indonesian Film Festival. Two years later he released Lovely Man, which followed a woman's search for her father and their interactions after she discovered he was a transsexual. He was quoted in the Jakarta Globe as saying that he did not want to portray transsexuals as comedic fodder, an approach common in Indonesian films.

Filmography
 Culik (Kidnap; short film; 2001)
 Banyu Biru (Blue Banyu; 2005)
 Ruang (Room; 2006)
 Badai Pasti Berlalu (The Storm Shall Surely Pass; 2007)
 Namaku Dick (My Name is Dick; 2008)
 Ruma Maida (Maida's House; 2009)
 Lovely Man (2011)
 Something in the Way (2013)
 About a Woman (2015)

Awards and nominations

References

Bibliography

External links

1975 births
Living people
Indonesian film directors
Maya Award winners
Alumni of the University of Wales, Newport